Steven Wirtel (born October 3, 1997) is an American football long snapper who is currently a free agent. He played college football at Iowa State, and originally signed with the Detroit Lions as an undrafted free agent in 2020. He has also played for the Los Angeles Rams.

Personal life and high school
Steven Wirtel was born on October 3, 1997, in Orland Park, Illinois to John and Coleen Wirtel. His brother, John Wirtel, played long snapper for Kansas. Wirtel attended Mount Carmel High School where he played football.

College career
Rated as a three-star recruit coming out of high school, Wirtel chose to attend Iowa State University over Illinois University and the University of Georgia. In his freshmen year, Wirtel played in all 12 games that season and was perfect on all of his snaps. He was named to the Big 12 Academic Rookie Team. In his second year, Wirtel once again played in all 13 games and was perfect again on all his snaps. He was named on the Third-Team All-Big 12 and the First-Team Academic All-Big 12 team. In his junior year, Wirtel once again played in all 13 games, and began to assume the role of long snapper for every aspect of special teams. He was named on the First-Team All-Big 12 and Second-Team Academic All-Big 12 teams. In his senior and final year, Wirtel once again played in all 13 games and therefore played in every game of his collegiate career. He was one of three finalists for the Patrick Mannelly Award, and was named on the First Team All-Big 12 and First Team Academic All-Big 12 teams.

Professional career

Detroit Lions
After going undrafted in the 2020 NFL Draft, Wirtel signed as an undrafted free agent for the Detroit Lions. Wirtel remained on the Lions' practice squad throughout the entirety of the 2020 NFL season and was waived in the subsequent offseason.

Los Angeles Rams
Wirtel was signed by the Los Angeles Rams at the beginning of the 2021 NFL season. He was later released on August 26.

Green Bay Packers
On September 2, 2021, the Green Bay Packers signed Wirtel to their practice squad. He was signed to the active roster on November 5, 2021, replacing the recently released Hunter Bradley. He made his first appearance in an NFL game two days later, in a 13–7 loss to the Kansas City Chiefs.  

On August 10, 2022, the Green Bay Packers released Wirtel.

References

External links
Green Bay Packers bio
Iowa State Cyclones bio

American football long snappers
Green Bay Packers players
Iowa State Cyclones football players
People from Orland Park, Illinois
1997 births
Living people